Ankova is a genus of moths in the subfamily Lymantriinae.

Species
Ankova belessichares (Collenette, 1936)
Ankova lignea (Butler, 1879)

References
Natural History Museum Lepidoptera genus database

Lymantriinae
Moth genera